Lake Hamilton and Lake Catherine are a pair of man-made lakes located in Hot Springs, Arkansas, serving as a tourist attraction for the area. Both Lakes were developed by Arkansas Power & Light.

History

Lake Hamilton 
Lake Hamilton is a  reservoir near Lake Hamilton, Arkansas and Hot Springs, Arkansas, located on the Ouachita River. It was named after Hamilton Moses, who later became president and chairman of the board for Arkansas Power and Light. The lake was created in 1932, formed as a result of Carpenter Dam (after Flavius Josephus Carpenter) which was constructed to generate hydroelectric power. The lake subsequently functioned as a recreational site after it started attracted tourists, later spurring the development of resorts, restaurants, and motels in its area, along with various water sport facilities. The Garvan Woodland Gardens, a  botanical park is located along its shore. Carpenter Dam was later listed on the National Register of Historic Places in 1992.

Lake Catherine 
The Lake Catherine State Park is located on the lake's shore. The lake was created in the 1920's with the building of Remmel Dam, a concrete-and-steel Ambursen-type buttressed dam. Remmel Dam was created to provide hydroelectricity, but the lake later developed into a recreational site as a result of lake's location next to Hot Springs.

Accidents 
On May 1, 1999, an accident involving the tourist boats on Lake Hamilton resulted in the deaths of thirteen people. Former State Senator Jim Keet, who was boating with his family at the time of the tragedy, co-sponsored a bill that added several new water safety rules to the Arkansas code four years earlier, including the requirement that children wear life preservers on most boats. However, the provision did not apply to DUKW ("duck") boats, the kind involved in the tragedy, which sank with barely thirty seconds of warning.

Gallery

Lake Hamilton

Lake Catherine

See also 
List of Arkansas dams and reservoirs
National Register of Historic Places listings in Garland County, Arkansas
National Register of Historic Places listings in Hot Spring County, Arkansas

References

External links
Lake Catherine State Park
Lake Catherine
Lake Hamilton

Hamilton
Protected areas of Garland County, Arkansas
Protected areas of Hot Spring County, Arkansas
Buildings and structures in Garland County, Arkansas
Buildings and structures in Hot Spring County, Arkansas
Bodies of water of Garland County, Arkansas
Bodies of water of Hot Spring County, Arkansas
Dams on the National Register of Historic Places in Arkansas
National Register of Historic Places in Hot Spring County, Arkansas
National Register of Historic Places in Garland County, Arkansas
Ouachita River
Entergy
Lake Catherine State Park